The Casamayoran age is a period of geologic time (50.0–48.0 Ma) within the Early Eocene epoch of the Paleogene, used more specifically within the South American land mammal age (SALMA) classification. It follows the Itaboraian and precedes the Mustersan age.

Several astrapotherian mammals are known from this period, such as Antarctodon and Albertogaudrya from Antarctica and Argentina, respectively. Albertogaudrya and Scaglia were the size of a sheep or a small tapir, hence among the larger mammals in South America at this time.

Etymology 
This age is named after the Casamayor Formation of the Golfo San Jorge Basin.

Formations

Fossils

References

Bibliography 
General
 

Casamayor Formation
 
 

Abanico Formation
 
 
 
 
 

Bogotá Formation
 
 
 

Cayara Formation
 
 
 

Chota Formation
 
 

Los Cuervos Formation
 

Fonseca Formation
 

Huitrera Formation
 

Laguna del Hunco Formation
 

Lumbrera Formation
 
 
 

Maíz Gordo Formation
 

Quebrada de Los Colorados Formation
 
 
 
 

Sarmiento Formation
 
 
 
 
 
 
 
 

 
Eocene South America
Paleogene Argentina